The largest flawless diamond in the world is known as The Paragon, a D-color gem weighing , and the tenth largest white diamond in the world. The gem was mined in Brazil and attracted attention for being an exceptional white, flawless stone of great size. The Mayfair-based jeweller Graff Diamonds acquired the stone in Antwerp, cut it into an unusual seven-sided kite shield configuration, and set it in a necklace which separates to both necklace and bracelet lengths. The necklace has associations with the end of the millennium and was worn by model Naomi Campbell at a diamond gala held by De Beers and Versace at Syon House in 1999.

See also
 List of diamonds

References

External links
entry at The World of Famous Diamonds

Individual diamonds
Individual necklaces
Diamonds originating in Brazil